The Klingnauer Stausee (or "Klingnau reservoir") is a reservoir near Böttstein, canton of Aargau, Switzerland, at .

See also
List of lakes of Switzerland

References

External links

http://www.klingnauerstausee.ch

Klingnau
Ramsar sites in Switzerland
Lakes of Aargau
RKlingnauer